Edward, Ed, or Eddie Miller may refer to:

Arts and entertainment
 Ed Miller (Scottish folk musician), Scottish folk singer
 Eddie Miller (jazz saxophonist) (1911–1991), jazz musician
 Eddie "Piano" Miller, piano player and bandleader, also known as Edward Lisbona (1905–1989)
 Eddie "The Bombardier" Miller, radio talk show host, see The Political Cesspool
 Eddie Miller (songwriter) (1919–1977), American songwriter in the country music genre
 Edward Miller (musician) (1735–1807), English organist and composer
 Edward Miller (playwright), American actor, playwright, and producer
 Edward Miller (born 1949), pseudonym of British fantasy, science fiction and horror illustrator Les Edwards

Politics
 Edward Allan Miller (born 1942), Canadian politician
 Edward B. Miller (born 1971), Deputy Chief of Staff to Maryland Governor Robert Ehrlich
 Edward E. Miller (1880–1946), U.S. Representative from Illinois
 Edward G. Miller Jr. (1911–1968), U.S. Assistant Secretary of State for Inter-American Affairs
 Edward Tylor Miller (1895–1968), U.S. Army officer and later U.S. Representative from Maryland

Sports

Association football
 Eddie Miller (footballer, born 1917) (1917–1940), English footballer, winger for Gateshead
 Eddie Miller (footballer, born 1920) (1920–2002), English footballer, inside forward for Barrow
 Edward Miller (footballer) (1908–1965), Polish footballer

Baseball
 Ed Miller (first baseman) (1888–1980), Major League Baseball first baseman
 Ed Miller (outfielder), American Association professional baseball player
 Eddie Miller (infielder) (1916–1997), baseball shortstop
 Eddie Miller (outfielder) (born 1957), retired Major League Baseball player
 Eddie Miller (pitcher) (1902–?), American Negro league baseball player

Other sports
 Eddie Miller (basketball) (1931–2014), American basketball player
 Eddie Miller (quarterback) (1916–2000), American football quarterback

 Eddie Miller (racing driver, born 1895) (1895–1965), American race car driver
 Eddie Miller (racing driver, born 1945) American race car driver from Colorado
 Eddie Miller (wide receiver) (born 1969), American football wide receiver

Other
 Ed Miller (poker player) (born 1979), American professional poker player and poker authority
 Eddie Miller, known as Bozo Miller, competitive eater

 Edward Alexander Millar (1860–1934), U.S. Army general
 Edward Miller (historian) (1915–2000), historian and Master of Fitzwilliam College, Cambridge
 Edward Miller (priest) (1854–1951), Anglican Archdeacon of Colombo
 Edward D. Miller (born 1943), Dean and CEO of Johns Hopkins Medicine
 Edward J. Miller (USMC) (1922–1993), United States Marine Corps general
 Edward J. Miller (warden) (1899–?), American prison administrator
 Edward M. Miller (born 1944), American economist and intelligence researcher
 Edward Miller (pirate) (fl. 1717–1720), English pirate active in the Caribbean
 Edward S. Miller, former FBI agent
 Edward T. Miller (outlaw) (1856–1881), outlaw who rode with Jesse James and also was killed by him